Christian Marti (born March 29, 1993) is a Swiss professional ice hockey defenceman who currently plays for the ZSC Lions of the National League (NL).

Playing career
Marti participated at the 2012 World Junior Ice Hockey Championships as a member of the Switzerland men's national junior ice hockey team. After transferring from the Kloten Flyers and playing two National League A seasons with Genève-Servette HC, Marti as an undrafted free agent, signed to an entry-level contract with the Philadelphia Flyers on May 1, 2015.

In the 2015–16 season, Marti attended the Flyers training camp before he was reassigned to American Hockey League affiliate, the Lehigh Valley Phantoms. In 27 games with the Phantoms, Marti registered 1 assist while also appearing in two games with the Reading Royals of the ECHL.

At the conclusion of his first North American season, Marti opted to leave the Flyers organization and return to his native Switzerland, signing a three-year deal with the ZSC Lions on June 14, 2016.

Career statistics

Regular season and playoffs

International

References

External links

1993 births
Living people
Blainville-Boisbriand Armada players
Genève-Servette HC players
EHC Kloten players
Lehigh Valley Phantoms players
People from Bülach
Reading Royals players
Swiss ice hockey defencemen
ZSC Lions players
Ice hockey players at the 2022 Winter Olympics
Olympic ice hockey players of Switzerland
Sportspeople from the canton of Zürich